Guiyang Longdongbao International Airport  is an airport serving Guiyang, the capital of Guizhou Province.

Guiyang Longdongbao Airport was opened on 28 May 1997 and adopted its current name on 19 January 2006.

In 2017, Guiyang Longdongbao International Airport was the 22nd busiest airport in mainland China, with 18,109,610 passengers.

Expansion
In 2010 Guiyang Airport exceeded its design capacity of 5 million passengers per year. An airport expansion project, with a total investment of about 3.4 billion yuan, was authorized and started in September 2010. The aim was to take the total annual passenger capacity to 15.5 million and the cargo traffic to 220 thousand tons per year.

Hainan Airlines began a weekly flight to Paris, France on March 24, 2019, opening up Guiyang and Guizhou Province to international long-haul air travel for the first time.

A-CDM
In June 2017, Guiyang airport launched cooperation with the aviation data service company VariFlight regarding the installation of Airport Collaborative Decision Making system (A-CDM). The main purpose of such system is to improve on-time performance and safety of the airport's operations.

Airlines and destinations

Passenger

Other facilities
China Express Airlines was previously headquartered on the grounds of Guiyang Longdongbao International Airport.

Traffic and statistics

Ground transportation

Guiyang Metro
A metro station, Longdongbao International Airport station on Line 2 (Guiyang Metro) serves the Airport.

China Railway

The airport is served by Longdongbao railway station, situated underneath the airport.

See also
List of airports in China
List of the busiest airports in China

References

Airports in Guizhou
Airports established in 1997
1997 establishments in China
Guiyang